Nancy Asire (born 1945) was an American fantasy and science fiction author, best known for her Twilight's Kingdoms fantasy trilogy and her contributions to the shared universe series Heroes in Hell, Sword of Knowledge and Merovingen Nights.

Bibliography

Twilight's Kingdoms
Twilight's Kingdoms (1987)
Tears of Time (1993)
To Fall Like Stars (1996)

Heroes in Hell
Heroes in Hell (1986)
Rebels in Hell (1986)
Crusaders in Hell (1987)
Angels in Hell (1987)
Masters in Hell (1987)
War in Hell (1988)
Prophets in Hell (1989)
Lawyers in Hell (2011)
Rogues in Hell (2012)
Dreamers in Hell (2013)
Poets in Hell (2014)
Doctors in Hell (2015)

Merovingen Nights
Festival Moon (1987)
Fever Season (1987)
Troubled Waters (1988)
Smugglers Gold (1988)
Divine Right (1989)
Flood Tide (1990)
Endgame (1991)

Sword of Knowledge
Wizard Spawn (1989) (with C. J. Cherryh)
The Sword of Knowledge (1995; omnibus including "A Dirge for Sabis", "Wizard Spawn" and "Reap the Whirlwind") (with C. J. Cherryh, Leslie Fish and Mercedes Lackey)
Note: C. J. Cherryh was the primary writer, and worked with a different collaborator in each volume, thus Nancy Asire is listed for only Volume 2, Wizard Spawn, and the Omnibus.

Short stories
"Table with a View" (1986)
"A Walk in the Park" (1986)
"By Invitation Only" (1987)
"Cat's Tale" (1987)
"Night Ride" (1987)
"The Conscience of the King" (1987) (with C. J. Cherryh)
"Houseguests" (1987)
"Fallout" (1988)
"By a Woman's Hand" (1988)
"A Fish Story" (1988)
"Fast Food" (1989)
"Draw Me a Picture" (1989)
"The Testing" (1990)
"The Testing (Reprised) (#1)" (1990)
"The Testing (Reprised) (#2)" (1990)
"The Testing (Reprised) (#3)" (1990)
"Bookworms" (1991)
"Family Ties" (1991)
"Family Ties" (Reprised) (#1) (1991)
"Family Ties" (Reprised) (#2) (1991)
"Owl Light" (1999) appeared in Flights of Fancy edited by Mercedes Lackey
"The Cat Who Came to Dinner" (2003)
"The Boogey Man's Wife" (2013) appeared in What Scares the Boogey Man? edited by John Manning

References

External links

Nancy Asire entry at Fantastic Fiction

1945 births
Living people
20th-century American novelists
21st-century American novelists
American fantasy writers
American science fiction writers
American women short story writers
American women novelists
Women science fiction and fantasy writers
20th-century American women writers
21st-century American women writers
20th-century American short story writers
21st-century American short story writers